Samira (also spelled Samirah, Sameera, and Sameerah /sæˈmiːrə/) is an Arabic female given name. It is derived from the root s-m-r ("to spend the night in talking"), ultimately meaning night-companion, entertaining companion, the one with lively conversation. The masculine version of this name is Samir.

In Sanskrit, Sameera (IAST: samīraḥ, Sanskrit: समीरः) is a masculine name, meaning "breeze, wind," or "the god of wind". Many people with the name deriving from Sanskrit shorten their name to Samir or Sameer.

People

Samira
 Samira Ahmed (born 1968), British television reporter
 Samira Asghari (born 1994), Afghan member of the International Olympic Committee
 Samira Awad (born 2000), Lebanese footballer
 Samira Bellil (1972–2004), French feminist working for the rights of women in traditional Muslim settings
 Samira Besic, German of singer of Bosnian origin of the Eurodance group Maxx
 Samira Efendi, Azerbaijani singer, who will represent Azerbaijan in the Eurovision Song Contest 2021 
 Samira Gutoc (born 1974), Filipino journalist and politician
 Samira Makhmalbaf (born 1980), Iranian film director
 Samira Mighty (born 1996), English television personality and actress
 Samira Mubareka (born 1972), Canadian clinical scientist
 Samira Said (born 1958), Moroccan pop singer
 Samira Shahbandar, Saddam Hussein's second wife
 Samira Tewfik (born 1935), Lebanese Syrian singer of Bedouin dialect
 Samira Wiley (born 1987), American actress
 Princess Samira, a fictional princess in Shimmer and Shine

Sameera
 Sameera Al Bitar (born 1990), Olympic swimmer from Bahrain
 Sameera bint Ibrahim Rajab, Bahraini politician
 Sameera Moussa, Egyptian  nuclear scientist 
 Sameera Perera (born 1988), Sri Lankan cricketer
 Sameera Reddy (born 1980), Indian film actress
 Sameera Sadamal (born 1993), Sri Lankan cricketer 
 Sameera Saneesh, Indian costume designer in Malayalam film

Fictional characters 
 Samira, The Desert Rose, a playable champion character in the MOBA video game League of Legends
 Samirah al-Abbas, a character in Rick Riordan's novel Magnus Chase and the Gods of Asgard

See also
 Sameera (disambiguation)
 Samara
 Samir, masculine form of the name

References

Arabic feminine given names
Iranian feminine given names
Bosnian feminine given names
Indian masculine given names
Indian feminine given names